Gorilla Jones was an African American boxer known as "The Fighting Gorilla" who fought out of Alexandria, Louisiana as a welterweight from 1913 to 1924. He may have provided the nickname for William Landon Jones (1906–1982), also known as Gorilla Jones, who was the second black boxer to win the world middleweight title.

Boxing career
Jones won on a first round disqualification against Battling Ortega from a low blow in Colorado, Springs on September 1, 1921.

On January 6, 1922, Jones defeated well known black boxer Speedball Hayden in a ninth round knockout at Fort Bliss Arena in El Paso, Texas.  Jones was favored in the early publicity for his powerful, aggressive infighting, and heavy hitting.  Hayden had defeated Jones earlier on April 1, 1921 in Phoenix, Arizona in an eight round points decision.  Jones was said to have put up a great effort but Hayden was clearly his master, deserving the decision.  On November 25, 1920, Jones lost a fourth round disqualification in Columbus, Ohio, but was reported by the El Paso Times to have knocked Hayden to the mat four times prior to the foul.

Taking the world colored welterweight championship, February, 1915

Because of the color bar in pro boxing, Jones never competed for the world title which was not open to black boxers during his career. He won the World Colored Welterweight Championship from Eddie Palmer, the inaugural champion, in a twenty round points decision in New Orleans on February 15, 1915, though he apparently never defended it. 

On February 21, 1922, he met future world middleweight champ Tiger Flowers, the first black boxer to win the world welterweight title, in Ciudad Juarez, Mexico for the Southwest Middleweight Championship. He lost in a fourth round knockout of a scheduled 15-round bout. A few sources report that Jones lost via a ninth round T.K.O.

Jones had a career record of 18 wins and 17 losses.  He was knocked out ten times and had two draws.

Professional boxing record

References

African-American boxers
Welterweight boxers
World colored welterweight boxing champions
American male boxers
Boxers from Louisiana
Year of birth missing
Place of birth missing
Year of death missing
Place of death missing